John James Bannon (June 14, 1940 – October 25, 2017) was an American actor. He was best known for his role as Art Donovan on Lou Grant, a role he played for the duration of the series, from 1977 to 1982.

Early life
Bannon was born on June 14, 1940 in Los Angeles, California. His parents were actors Jim Bannon and Bea Benaderet. He graduated from the University of California, Santa Barbara in 1963.

Career 
At age 24, Bannon began working as a dialog coach on Petticoat Junction, the sitcom on which his mother starred. In 1963, he appeared in the Season 1 episode "Kate's Recipe for Hot Rhubarb" of the series as Bobbie Joe's date, Roger. In 1969, Bannon was seen again on Petticoat Junction (after his mother died in 1968) appearing as Buck in the episode "One of Our Chickens Is Missing".

Bannon portrayed Buck Williams in the drama Trauma Center (1983). He also appeared in other television series of the 1960s, 1970s and 1980s, including The Beverly Hillbillies, Green Acres, Daniel Boone, Kojak, The Rockford Files, Charlie's Angels, and Simon & Simon.

Bannon's signature role was that of Art Donovan on Lou Grant. Bannon's obituary in The Hollywood Reporter described the character as an "amiable assistant editor" of the fictional Los Angeles Tribune newspaper. The actor appeared in all 114 episodes of the series.

The actor's film career included What Ever Happened to Aunt Alice? (1969), Little Big Man (1970), and Death Warrant (1990). On stage, he acted for 20 years in the Coeur d’Alene Summer Theatre company.

Death
Bannon died on October 25, 2017 in Coeur d'Alene, Idaho, from cancer at the age of 77.  He was survived by his wife, Ellen Travolta, an actress and elder sister of John Travolta, a sister, and two stepchildren.

Filmography

References

External links
 

1940 births
2017 deaths
20th-century American male actors
American male film actors
American male television actors
American people of Turkish-Jewish descent

Deaths from cancer in Idaho
Male actors from Los Angeles
Travolta family
University of California, Santa Barbara alumni